Reask  is a ruined early Monastic site located 1 km east of Baile an Fheirtéaraigh, County Kerry, Ireland. Although nothing remains of the buildings but low walls and a cross-slab standing stone which sits in the middle of the compound.  

Some of the artefacts found in the excavation at Reask, including some of the cross-inscribed stones, are on display in Músaem Chorca Dhuibhne, which is in the nearby village of Baile an Fheirtéaraigh.

The site is a National Monument in state care.

References

Sources
 McNally, Kenneth. "Ireland's Ancient Stones". Belfast: Appletree Press, 2006. 
 Noonan, Damien. "Castles & Ancient Monuments of Ireland". London: Arum Press, 2001. 
 Fanning, Thomas. "Excavation of an Early Christian Cemetery and Settlement at Reask, County Kerry, 1981, Proceedings of the Royal Irish Academy Vol.81C, p67-172

External links
 Entry at megalithicireland.com

Megalithic monuments in Ireland
Archaeological sites in County Kerry
National Monuments in County Kerry